Gillian Evelyn Joynson-Hicks, Viscountess Brentford,  (née Schluter; born 22 November 1942) is a British evangelical Anglican and activist. She served as the Third Church Estates Commissioner, one of the most senior lay people in the Church of England, from 1999 to 2005. She was also President of the Church Mission Society (CMS) between 1998 and 2007.

Personal life
Born Gillian Evelyn Schluter on 22 November 1942, she was educated at West Heath School, an all-girls private school near Sevenoaks, Kent.

On 21 March 1964, she married Crispin Joynson-Hicks. He became the 4th Viscount Brentford in 1983, and as his wife, she uses the style of Viscountess Brentford. Together they have four children: one son and three daughters.

Career
Joynson-Hicks is a chartered accountant, qualifying FCA (Fellow Chartered Accountant) in 1965.

Church service
Joynson-Hicks was Chair of the House of Laity of the Diocese of Chichester from 1991 to 1999, and a member of the General Synod of the Church of England from 1990 to 2005. She served as a Church Commissioner from 1991 to 1998, and then as the Third Church Estates Commissioner from 1999 to 2005. She additionally sat on the Crown Appointments Commission from 1995 to 2002, and as such was involved in the appointment of Church of England bishops.

Outside of the Church of England, she was President of the Church Mission Society (CMS) between 1998 and 2007: the CMS is an evangelical Anglican and ecumenical Protestant missionary organisation. She is a patron of the Family Education Trust, a traditionalist society with links to the New Right.

Honours
In the 1996 Queen's Birthday Honours, Joynson-Hicks was appointed an Officer of the Order of the British Empire (OBE) "for humanitarian services and for services to the community in London". She served as High Sheriff of East Sussex, a ceremonial role and one of the Monarch's representatives in the county, from 1998 to 1999.

References

 

 
 
 

1942 births
Living people
Evangelical Anglicans
British Anglicans
Church Estates Commissioners
Officers of the Order of the British Empire
High Sheriffs of Sussex
Members of the General Synod of the Church of England